The Devario annnataliae, is a fish belonging to the minnow family (Cyprinidae).  It is endemic to Sri Lanka. However, the validity of the species description was noted problematic by several other local ichthyologists.

Etymology
The specific name annnataliae, is in honor of Natalie Ann Ratnaweera, a wildlife enthusiast.

Description
Body with 5–6 irregular vertical bars on anterior half. Danionin notch present. Lateral line complete. There is a minute process on first infraorbital. Dorsum light yellowish with a metallic sheen. Body silvery sheen laterally and ventrally. Vertical bars metallic blue with bright yellowish interspaces. Medial caudal rays often dark blue. Other fins hyaline to orange.

Ecology
It is found from torrential waters of Brahmana Ella waterfall in Sinharaja Rain Forest.

References 

Devario
Cyprinid fish of Asia
Freshwater fish of Sri Lanka
Fish described in 2017